In human genetics, Y Haplogroup E-M123 is a Y-chromosome haplogroup, and defined by the single nucleotide polymorphism (SNP) mutation M123. Like its closest relatives within the larger E-M215 haplogroup, E-M123 is found in Asia, Europe and Africa.

Origin
The Middle East has been proposed as the most likely origin for this lineage rather than East Africa.
In fact E-M34 seems to be restricted to Ethiopia, as it has not been detected in other populations in the region such as
Somalia, Kenya

Distribution
E-M123 is best known for its major sub-clade E-M34, which dominates this clade. However, earlier studies did not test for E-M34. Looking beyond its geographical patterns, E-M123 is also quite common in many Semitic language communities, including among both Ashkenazi and Sephardic Jews, accounting for over 10% of all male lines .

Subclade distribution

E-M123* (tested and definitely without E-M34)
Such cases are relatively rare, but the following have been reported.
 located one individual in Bulgaria after testing 3401 individuals from five continents (of which 116 were Bulgarian), and  located one individual in Central Asia out of 1062 people tested, including 184 from Central Asia and Siberia.
In a 568-person study in Iberia,  found two E-M123* individuals, both in Northern Portugal out of 109 people tested there.
In a 553-person study of Portugal,  also found two E-M123* individuals in Northern Portugal, out of 101 people, as well as 2 in Madeira out of 129 people tested there.
 found one individual out of 146 Jordanians, this being one of the 101 individuals tested in Amman.
 found 1 Tunisian from Tunis in their study of 275 men in Northern Africa, which included 148 people from Tunis.
Studies which tested for E-M123* but found none include...
, with 523 individuals in Anatolia;
 found none amongst the significant presence of E-M34 they found in their study of the UAE, Yemen and Qatar.
 found none in their 168 person study of Crete.
 found none in their study of 169 Israelis and Palestinians of various ancestry.
E-M123 has sometimes been reported without checking for the M-34 SNP, for example:
 found E-M123 examples in Greece, the Republic of Macedonia, and Romania.
 also found examples in Portugal.
 found one sample in Somalia.
 reports relatively high levels of 13% in the Albanian community of Cosenza, in Calabria. A notably high regional frequency for E-M123 was in Oman, where it is apparently the dominant clade of E-M35.
 found 12 men out of 121 there were E-M123 positive, while in Egypt there were 7 out of 147. But in that study the Omani E-M123 diversity implied a younger age than the E-M123 found in Egypt. ( tested for E-M34 in Oman and found 7.7% to be E-M34+, with no E-M123*.)
 found 4.66% overall in their 236-person study of Sicily, with higher levels in the east of the island. They found none in Trapani (33 people), Alcamo (24 people), and Cacamo (16 people) along the west of the north coast; 3.23% in San Ninfa (31 people) inland in the west; 3.57% in Sciacca (28 people) and Ragusa (28 people) along the south coast; and then high levels in the east in Troina (10% of 30 people), Piazza Armerina (10.71% of 28 people), as well as near the Southwestern extreme facing Africa at Mazaro de Vallo (11.11% of 18 people).
 found 11 E-M123 people in their 1140-person study of Iberia: 1 out of 95 Eastern Andalusians; 1 out of 100 NW Castilians; 1 out of 80 Catalans; 2 out of 52 Extramadurans; 2 out of 60 Northern Portuguese, 1 out of 78 Southern Portuguese, 1 out of 73 Southern Portuguese; 1 out of 73 Valencians; and highest levels apparently in the Balearics with 5 out of 37 Minorcans and 4 out of 54 Ibizans. There were none in Majorca (62 people), Gascony (24), Galicia (88), NE Castile (31), Castilla la Mancha (63), The Basque Country (116), the Asturias (20), West Andalucia (73), and Aragon (34).
 found 9 out of 323 people in 3 areas of Sardinia. 4 out of 187 in Cagliari, 1 out of 103 in Sorgono, and 4 out of 86 in Tempio.
 found 10 out of 169 Israelis and Palestinians of various ancestry to be M123+ and M34+, with the highest level group being 4 out of 20 Israeli Jews of Libyan ancestry
And E-M34 has sometimes been tested without testing for M123:
However, because the diversity is apparently low in Ethiopia, the authors suggest that E-M34 was likely introduced into Ethiopia from the Near East.
In Turkey,  found slightly more E-M34 (29) than E-M78 (26) out of 523 individuals tested (a far different E1b1b population than found in the nearby Balkans).
 reported E-M34 in several parts of Iberia, but most strikingly about 10% in Galicia.
 found about the same levels of E-M34 in Portugal as E-M123*, but E-M34 mainly in Central Portugal (4 people out of 102 tested there) with one more person found in the Açores.
Strikingly,  found 14 out of 45 men tested in the Dead Sea area of Jordan to be M34 positive (31.1%), while in the capital Amman there were only 4 out of 101.
 found 8.1% of 62 men tested in Yemen were positive for M34, compared to much lower levels in Qatar (1.4%) and the UAE (3.1%).
 in their study of 275 men in Northern Africa found 2 out of 148 Tunisians from Tunis, 2 out of 19 Algerian Berbers from Tizi Ouzu in Kabylie (10.5%), and 3 out of 44 North Egyptians, 4 out of 29 South Egyptians (So 9.5% in all Egyptians).
 found 3 in their 168-person study of Crete, 2 in Heraklion and 1 in Lasithi.
 found one in South Iran out of 117 people, and none in North Iran out of 33 people.
 found 26 E-M123 cases in Cyprus, out of 164 men tested; and 27 Palestinians out of 291 tested. This was apparently higher than the level of E-M78.

Subclades of E-M34
E-M84, defined by SNP mutation M84, with M136 defining a sub-clade as of October 2008. The E-M35 Phylogeny Project estimates based on testing so far (in January 2009) that E-M84 is dominant in 6 out of the 8 clusters of E-M34 which that project identifies.
E-M290, defined by SNP mutation M290.  found 1 Palestinian exemplar.
E-V23, defined by SNP mutation V23.  announced the discovery of this clade. They found it in two African individuals. The authors warned that they had not yet confirmed that this clade was not a sub-clade or parent clade of either M84 or M290, so the phylogenetic position E1b1b1c1c is tentative.

Ancient DNA
 According to the genetic analyses done on six Natufian remains from Northern Israel, the Natufians carried the Y-DNA haplogroup E-Z830, a somewhat upwind clade of E-M123 (and therefore ancestral to it). The Natufians were one of the first settled peoples in the world and may have contributed to the domestication of certain crops, and thus the advent of agriculture. The discovery of E-Z830 (without other clades) suggests an indigenous presence in Canaan and Israel that predates all other clades, which are not known to have existed in the region at the time (10,000 years before present). E-M123 is thought to have a TMRCA about 18,000 years ago, 8,000 years before the Natufian (possibly ancestral) remains are from. 

 Haplogroup E1b1b1b2 has been found in 75% of the 'Ain Ghazal population, along with 60% of PPNB populations circa  8,800–6,500 BC. (See: 'Ain Ghazal#Genetics).

 A study on population genomics of Anatolia, the Caucasus and the Levant found in Arslantepe one individual who lived circa 3369-3110 BC, who belonged to E-M84 (E1b1b1b2a1a1~).

 A study on the population genomics of Bronze Age Eurasia found in the remains from Nerkin Getashen in Armenia, lived during the Middle Bronze Age, two E-M84.

 A study on population genomics of Anatolia, the Caucasus and the Levant found in the ancient city of Ebla during the Bronze Age, one male individual who is E-M84 (E1b1b1b2a1a1~).

 A study on South Asian history, Narasimhan et al. (2019), found several individuals who belonged to E-Y31991 in Late Bronze Age/Early Iron Age samples in the Swat valley, modern north Pakistan.

 A 137-sample study of ancient Eurasian genomes found one Central Scythian who belonged to E-M123* (E-Y31991), in modern northeast Kazakhstan, dated from 800-750BC. According to the BAM file, made available by the authors, he's presumed to be E-Y168273, a clade downstream of PF4428 which is itself under E-M123*.

Phylogenetics

Phylogenetic history

Prior to 2002, there were in academic literature at least seven naming systems for the Y-Chromosome Phylogenetic tree. This led to considerable confusion. In 2002, the major research groups came together and formed the Y-Chromosome Consortium (YCC). They published a joint paper that created a single new tree that all agreed to use. Later, a group of citizen scientists with an interest in population genetics and genetic genealogy formed a working group to create an amateur tree aiming at being above all timely.  The table below brings together all of these works at the point of the landmark 2002 YCC Tree. This allows a researcher reviewing older published literature to quickly move between nomenclatures.

Research publications
The following research teams per their publications were represented in the creation of the YCC tree.

Phylogenetic trees
E-M123 (M123)
E-M34 (M34)
E-M84 (M84)
E-M136 (M136)
E-M290 (M290)
E-V23 (V23)
E-L791 (L791,L792)

See also

Genetics

Y-DNA E subclades

Y-DNA backbone tree

References

Notes

Works cited

Sources for conversion tables

Additional sources

 

 

E1b1b1c